The March 79B is an open-wheel formula racing car, designed, developed and built by March Engineering, for the Formula Atlantic racing series, in 1979. It was powered by a   Ford-Cosworth BDD four-cylinder engine.

References

Formula Atlantic
March vehicles